Aleksandr Valentinovich Sokolov (Russian: Александр Валентинович Соколов; born 4 August 1970) is a Russian politician, who is currently the governor of Kirov Oblast since 10 May 2022.

Biography

Aleksandr Sokolov was born in Kostroma on 4 August 1970.

He graduated from Moscow State Institute of International Relations, and started as a history teacher. He worked as the first deputy governor of the Kostroma Oblast for domestic policy, in addition, he oversaw culture, cultural heritage and youth.

He was marked with gratitude from the President of Russia in 2000.

In 2014, Sokolov was appointed the Deputy Governor of Kostroma Oblast for Domestic Policy, then promoted to First Deputy Governor.

In 2017, he left the service in the Kostroma authorities and moved to the position of assistant in the Presidential Administration in the department for ensuring the activities of the State Council of Russia.

He was awarded with the Acting State Councilor Class III in 2018.

On 10 May 2022, Sokolov became the acting governor of Kirov Oblast.

References

1970 births
Living people
United Russia politicians
21st-century Russian politicians
Governors of Kirov Oblast
People from Kostroma
Moscow State Institute of International Relations alumni